Elvir Čolić (born 17 July 1986) is a Bosnian retired footballer who played as a right-back. He most recently played for NK GOŠK Gabela in the First League of FBiH.

International career
He made his debut for Bosnia and Herzegovina in a June 2009 friendly match against Uzbekistan, which remained his sole international appearance.

Honours
Željezničar
Bosnian Premier League: 2011–12, 2012–13
Bosnian Cup: 2010–11, 2011–12

GOŠK Gabela
First League of FBiH: 2016–17

References

External links
 
 

1986 births
Living people
Sportspeople from Mostar
Association football fullbacks
Bosnia and Herzegovina footballers
Bosnia and Herzegovina international footballers
FK Velež Mostar players
NK Čelik Zenica players
FK Željezničar Sarajevo players
NK Zvijezda Gradačac players
NK GOŠK Gabela players
Premier League of Bosnia and Herzegovina players
First League of the Federation of Bosnia and Herzegovina players